1949 in sports describes the year's events in world sport.

American football
 NFL Championship: the Philadelphia Eagles won 14–0	over the Los Angeles Rams at the Los Angeles Memorial Coliseum
 Cleveland Browns 21–7 San Francisco 49ers for the All-America Football Conference championship. After the 1949 season, the Browns, 49ers and original Baltimore Colts all joined the NFL for the 1950 season.
 The decades–long "color barrier" in athletics for the Big Seven Conference is broken by Harold Robinson, playing football for Kansas State.  Robinson would go on to be named All–Conference in 1950.
 Notre Dame Fighting Irish – college football national championship

Association football
England
 First Division – Portsmouth win the 1948–49 title.
 FA Cup – Wolverhampton Wanderers beat Leicester City 3–1.
Italy
 Superga air disaster – a plane carrying the Torino team crashes into a mountain on May 4, killing everyone on board. Of the entire squad, only one player (who didn't fly, due to injury) survived, as well as potential signing Ladislao Kubala, who was due to fly but did not, due to his son's ill health.

On 21 September 1949 at Goodison Park, Liverpool, the home of Everton, England were defeated 2-0 by Ireland in a friendly international.

Australian rules football
 Victorian Football League
 Essendon wins the 53rd VFL Premiership (Essendon 18.17 (125) d Carlton 6.16 (52))
 Brownlow Medal awarded to Ron Clegg (South Melbourne) and Col Austen (Hawthorn)

Baseball
 January 28 – The New York Giants sign their first black players: Negro leaguers outfielder Monte Irvin and pitcher Ford Smith. Both men are assigned to Jersey City. Irvin will star for the Giants, but Smith will not reach the major leagues.
 May 5 – Hall of Fame election.  After a runoff election was necessary, Charlie Gehringer is selected for induction; on May 9, the Old-Timers Committee elects Mordecai "Three Finger" Brown and Kid Nichols as its first selections in 3 years.
 June 5 – MLB Commissioner Happy Chandler lifts the ban on all players who jumped to the Mexican League, starting in 1946.
 June 15 – Philadelphia Phillies first baseman Eddie Waitkus is shot in Chicago by deranged fan Ruth Ann Steinhagen.
 June 25 – College World Series - Texas Longhorns defeated Wake Forest 10 to 3
 The New York Yankees won the World Series over the Brooklyn Dodgers four games to one.
 December 5 – Hiroshima Carp, officially founded, with participation in Central League of Japan.

Basketball
BAA (NBA) Finals

Minneapolis Lakers win four games to two over the Washington Capitols

NBL Championship

Anderson Packers win three games to none over the Oshkosh All-Stars

Events
 On August 3 the NBL merges with the BAA.  The BAA also renames itself as the National Basketball Association.
 The sixth European basketball championship, Eurobasket 1949, is won by Egypt.
 The fourteenth South American Basketball Championship in Asunción is won by Uruguay.

Boxing
 October 27 – death of Marcel Cerdan (33), Algerian–born French world middleweight champion, in an air crash

Cricket
In the course of playing a Ranji Trophy semi-final at Poona in March, Bombay and Maharashtra set the still-standing record for the highest match aggregate of runs scored in a first-class match – 2,376 runs.

Figure skating
 World Figure Skating Championships –
 Men's champion: Dick Button, United States
 Ladies' champion: Aja Zanova, Czechoslovakia
 Pair skating champion: Andrea Kékesy & Ede Király, Hungary

Golf
Men's professional
 Masters Tournament – Sam Snead
 PGA Championship – Sam Snead
 U.S. Open – Cary Middlecoff
 British Open – Bobby Locke
Men's amateur
 British Amateur – Max McCready
 U.S. Amateur – Charles Coe
Women's professional
 Women's Western Open – Louise Suggs
 U.S. Women's Open – Louise Suggs
 Titleholders Championship – Peggy Kirk

Horse racing
Steeplechases
 Cheltenham Gold Cup – Cottage Rake
 Grand National – Russian Hero
Hurdle races
 Champion Hurdle – Hatton's Grace
Flat races
 Australia – Melbourne Cup won by Foxzami
 Canada – King's Plate won by Epic
 France – Prix de l'Arc de Triomphe won by Coronation
 Ireland – Irish Derby Stakes won by Hindostan
 English Triple Crown Races:
 2,000 Guineas Stakes – Nimbus
 The Derby – Nimbus
 St. Leger Stakes – Ridge Wood
 United States Triple Crown Races:
 Kentucky Derby – Ponder
 Preakness Stakes – Capot
 Belmont Stakes – Capot

Ice hockey
Stanley Cup
 Toronto Maple Leafs sweep the Detroit Red Wings four games to none.
Sweden
 Canada defeats Denmark 47–0 at the 1949 World Hockey Championships in Stockholm, Sweden.
United States
 NCAA Men's Ice Hockey Championship – Boston College Eagles defeat Dartmouth College Big Green 4–3 in Colorado Springs, Colorado

Motorsport

Rowing
The Boat Race
 26 March — Cambridge wins the 95th Oxford and Cambridge Boat Race

Rugby league
Australia
1949 NSWRFL season

England
1948–49 Northern Rugby Football League season/1949–50 Northern Rugby Football League season

Rugby union
Five Nations Championship
 55th Five Nations Championship series is won by Ireland
 3 September – "blackest day" in All Blacks history as two Test matches are lost on the same day: 6–11 at home to the Wallabies; and 3–9 on tour to South Africa.

Snooker
 World Snooker Championship – Fred Davis beats Walter Donaldson 80–65.

Speed skating
Speed Skating World Championships
 Men's All-round Champion – Kornél Pajor (Hungary)
 Women's All-round Champion – Maria Isakova (USSR)

Tennis
Australia
 Australian Men's Singles Championship – Frank Sedgman (Australia) defeats John Bromwich (Australia) 6–3, 6–2, 6–2
 Australian Women's Singles Championship – Doris Hart (USA) defeats Nancye Wynne Bolton (Australia) 6–3, 6–4
England
 Wimbledon Men's Singles Championship – Ted Schroeder (USA) defeats Jaroslav Drobný (Czechoslovakia) 3–6, 6–0, 6–3, 4–6, 6–4
 Wimbledon Women's Singles Championship – Louise Brough Clapp (USA) defeats Margaret Osborne duPont (USA) 10–8, 1–6, 10–8
France
 French Men's Singles Championship – Frank Parker (USA) defeats Budge Patty (USA) 6–3, 1–6, 6–1, 6–4
 French Women's Singles Championship – Margaret Osborne duPont (USA) defeats Nelly Adamson Landry (France) 7–5, 6–2
USA
 American Men's Singles Championship – Pancho Gonzales (USA) defeats Ted Schroeder (USA) 16–18, 2–6, 6–1, 6–2, 6–4
 American Women's Singles Championship – Margaret Osborne duPont (USA) defeats Doris Hart (USA) 6–3, 6–1
Davis Cup
 1949 Davis Cup –  4–1  at West Side Tennis Club (grass) New York City, United States

Volleyball 
 Men's World Championship in Prague won by the USSR

Awards
 Associated Press Male Athlete of the Year – Leon Hart, College football
 Associated Press Female Athlete of the Year – Marlene Bauer, LPGA golf

References

 
Sports by year